Fellner is a surname. Notable people with the surname include:

Eduardo Fellner (born 1954), Argentine politician
Eric Fellner (born 1959), British film producer
Ferdinand Fellner (architect) (1847–1916), Austrian architect
Ferdinand Fellner (painter) (1799–1869), German designer and painter
Hermann Fellner (born 1950), German politician, representative of the Christian Social Union of Bavaria
Jakab Fellner von Fellenthal, (1722–1780), Moravian-Hungarian architect
Jamie Fellner, Senior Counsel for the United States Program of Human Rights Watch
Liliana Fellner (born 1957), Argentine politician
Rosie Fellner (born 1978), Irish actress
Till Fellner (born 1972), Austrian pianist
Werner Jaffé Fellner (1914–2009), German chemist and university professor
Joe Fellner (born 1931–2018), Hungarian Holocaust survivor 

German-language surnames